The Oakland Athletics' 1982 season involved the A's finishing fifth in the American League West with a record of 68 wins and 94 losses.

The 1982 Athletics are remembered mainly for the exploits of star left fielder Rickey Henderson. Henderson, in his fourth major league season, stole an MLB-record 130 bases over the course of the year. Henderson broke the record, previously held by Lou Brock, by swiping his 119th base of the season on August 27 against the Milwaukee Brewers. Henderson's record has not been approached since.

The season also marked the end of manager Billy Martin's tenure with the Athletics. Martin was unceremoniously fired at season's end, despite having led the A's to the ALCS only one season prior. He was replaced by Steve Boros.

Offseason 
 December 4, 1981: Joe Rudi was signed as a free agent by the Athletics.
 December 9, 1981: Rich Bordi was traded by the Athletics to the Seattle Mariners for Dan Meyer.
 February 7, 1982: Dennis Kinney was signed as a free agent by the Athletics.
 February 24, 1982: Craig Minetto was traded by the Athletics to the Baltimore Orioles for Allen Edwards (minors).

Regular season 
In the first fifty games of the season, Rickey Henderson had stolen 49 bases. By the All-Star break, Henderson had 84 steals.

 October 3, 1982: Joe Rudi hit a home run in the last at-bat of his career.

Season standings

Record vs. opponents

Notable transactions 
 May 14, 1982: Rob Picciolo was traded by the Athletics to the Milwaukee Brewers for Mike Warren and John Evans (minors).
 June 7, 1982: 1982 Major League Baseball Draft
Phil Stephenson was drafted by the Athletics in the 3rd round.
Charlie O'Brien was drafted by the Athletics in the 5th round.
Jeff Kaiser was drafted by the Athletics in the 10th round.
Jim Eppard was drafted by the Athletics in the 13th round.
José Canseco was drafted by the Athletics in the 15th round. Canseco signed on June 17, 1982.
 June 28, 1982: Jim Spencer was released by the Oakland Athletics.
 July 15, 1982: Preston Hanna was signed as a free agent by the Athletics.
 September 6, 1982: Rick Bosetti was released by the Athletics.

Roster

Player stats

Batting

Starters by position 
Note: Pos = Position; G = Games played; AB = At bats; H = Hits; Avg. = Batting average; HR = Home runs; RBI = Runs batted in

Other batters 
Note: G = Games played; AB = At bats; H = Hits; Avg. = Batting average; HR = Home runs; RBI = Runs batted in

Pitching

Starting pitchers 
Note: G = Games pitched; IP = Innings pitched; W = Wins; L = Losses; ERA = Earned run average; SO = Strikeouts

Other pitchers 
Note: G = Games pitched; IP = Innings pitched; W = Wins; L = Losses; ERA = Earned run average; SO = Strikeouts

Relief pitchers 
Note: G = Games pitched; W = Wins; L = Losses; SV = Saves; ERA = Earned run average; SO = Strikeouts

Farm system 

LEAGUE CHAMPIONS: West Haven, Modesto

References

External links
1982 Oakland Athletics team page at Baseball Reference
1982 Oakland Athletics team page at www.baseball-almanac.com

Oakland Athletics seasons
Oakland Athletics season
Oak